Yandell is both a surname and given name.

Surname
 Benjamin Yandell (1951–2004), American author
 David Wendel Yandell (1826–1898), American physician and educator
 Enid Yandell (1869–1934), American sculptor
 Keith Yandell (1938–2020), American philosopher and writer
 Lance Yandell (born 1970), American football player
 Lunsford Yandell (1805–1878), American physician and educator
 Lunsford Yandell Jr. (1837–1884), American physician and educator
 Paul Yandell (1935–2011), American musician
 Ralph Yandell (1892–1982), British gymnast

Given name
 Yandell Henderson (1873–1944), American physiologist